Philippa Elaine Fanti Bennett-Warner (born 23 July 1988) is a British actress. She was nominated for an Ian Charleson Award in 2010 for her performance as Cordelia in Michael Grandage's production of King Lear, and long-listed for Best Actress at the 2012 Evening Standard Theatre Awards for her role in the play The Witness at Royal Court Theatre.

On television, she is best known for starring in the Sky Atlantic crime drama Gangs of London (2020–present) and the BBC thrillers Roadkill (2020) and Chloe (2022).

Early life
Bennett-Warner was brought up in Buckinghamshire, and was educated at St Edward's School in Oxford, and Lucie Clayton Charm Academy. She is of Jamaican and Kittitian descent, and has a sister, Georgina, who is three years older.

Career

Early work (1999–2009) 
She started her acting career in Julie Taymor's 1999 London production of The Lion King, as one of the original young Nalas.

In 2006, she got a place at Royal Academy of Dramatic Art and the role of Emmie Thibodeaux in the musical Caroline, or Change, for which she was nominated for the Whatsonstage.com Stuart Phillips London Newcomer of the Year award 2007, alongside Andrew Garfield. She went on to star in the lead role in Athol Fugard's UK premiere of Victory for the Peter Hall Company and then went to RADA in September 2007.

Bennett-Warner graduated from RADA in 2010, but left early to take on the role of Sophie in Lynn Nottage's Ruined at the Almeida Theatre. Before completing the course she was awarded the prestigious Carleton Hobbs Radio Award. However, due to another job commitment she was unable to join the radio rep.

After finishing Ruined, a two-hander (Crocodile, written by Frank McGuinness) with Sinéad Cusack for Sky Arts followed. During this time Bennett-Warner was cast in Michael Grandage's award-winning King Lear as Cordelia, with Derek Jacobi in the title role. Before rehearsals started for King Lear in October, she filmed small parts in Come Fly With Me with David Walliams and Ashley Lucas and also in Case Histories alongside Jason Isaacs.

Breakthrough (2010–present) 
Bennett-Warner received an Ian Charleson commendation for King Lear. She then took the role of Denise in D. C. Moore's new play The Swan — in a role that had been written for her – at the National Theatre followed by playing Queen Isabel in Michael Grandage's swan song Richard II at the Donmar Warehouse with Eddie Redmayne in the title role and Andrew Buchan as Bolingbroke in 2010. She received positive reviews from the critics, with Kate Bassett from The Independent saying: "Both of them (Redmayne and Buchan) are, in fact, outshone by Pippa Bennett-Warner in the cameo role of Isabel, Richard’s devoted, fiery queen."

In 2012, she played the lead role in Vivienne Franzmann's second play The Witness, at the Royal Court Theatre. She received rave reviews with Susannah Clapp from The Observer stating, "Always thought Pippa Bennett-Warner had big future. Now she is having it in ‘The Witness’ at Royal Court...There are actresses (even actors) who are more flashy, who more obviously inflect every detail of a speech. PBW is completely natural. Audiences of course admire her: but they do something else, which is not always the same thing: they believe her”. Bennett-Warner went on to secure a nomination for Best Actress at the Evening Standard Theatre Awards 2012, alongside Cate Blanchett and Dame Eileen Atkins and was named as one of the 1000 Most Influential Londoners in 2012 in the category "Generation Next" by The Evening Standard.

In 2016, she narrated Zadie Smith's book Swing Time. From 2018-2019 she played the title role in The Maya Angelou Autobiographies for BBC Radio 4. In 2020, she narrated Bernardine Evaristo's Girl, Woman, Other for the BBC.

Personal life
She is an Ambassador for The Theatres Trust.

Bennett-Warner is good friends with Jonathan Bailey who she appeared with in Doctor Who'''s "Time Heist" episode in 2014. Bailey also photographed her for a profile for Rose & Ivy magazine in 2021.

Filmography
 Film 

 Television 

 Theatre 
1999 The Lion King, Young Nala, Lyceum Theatre
2006 Caroline or Change by Tony Kushner, Emmie Thibodeaux, National Theatre
2007 Victory by Athol Fugard, Vicky, Theatre Royal Bath
2010 Ruined by Lynn Nottage, Sophie, Almeida Theatre
2010 Crocodile by Frank McGuiness, Girl, Riverside Studios
2010 King Lear by William Shakespeare, Cordelia, Donmar Warehouse, BAM
2011 The Swan by D.C. Moore, Denise, National Theatre
2011 Richard II by William Shakespeare, Queen Isabel, Donmar Warehouse
2012 The Witness by Vivienne Franzmann, Alex, Royal Court Theatre
2015 The Beaux' Stratagem by George Farquhar, Dorinda, Royal National Theatre

 Radio 
 The White Devil as Zanche (BBC Radio 3, 2010)
 Their Eyes Were Watching God as Janie (BBC World drama, 2010)
 The Great Gatsby as Daisy Buchanan (BBC Radio 4, 2012)
 The Witness as Alex (BBC Radio 3, 2013)
 Doctor Thorne as Mary Thorne (BBC Radio 4, 2014)
 The Awakening as Edna Pontellier (BBC Radio 4, 2014)
 Everyday Time Machines as Samantha (BBC Radio 3, 2014)
 The Ice Wife as Kate (BBC Radio 4, 2014)
 Paterson as Marie (BBC Radio 3, 2014)
 Talisman as Edie (BBC Radio 4, 2014)
 Dinner as Sian (BBC Radio 4, 2015)
 Heat and Dust as Olivia (BBC Radio 4, 2015)
 Inspector Chen as Catherine Rohn (BBC Radio 4, 2015)
 Beloved as Denver (BBC Radio 4, 2015)
 Wolf in the Water as Jessica (BBC Radio 3, 2016)
  The Maya Angelou Autobiographies as Maya Angelou (BBC Radio 4 2018–2019)

 Video game 

 Elden Ring as Malenia, Blade of Miquella (2022)
 Xenoblade Chronicles 3'' as Monica Vandham (2022)

References

External links
 

British stage actresses
Living people
1988 births
People educated at St Edward's School, Oxford
British Shakespearean actresses
British film actresses
Black British actresses
Alumni of RADA
People from Banbury
Actors from Oxfordshire
English people of Saint Kitts and Nevis descent
English people of Jamaican descent
British radio actresses
British television actresses
20th-century British actresses
21st-century British actresses